The 1958–59 season was Port Vale's 48th season of football in the English Football League, and their first season in the Third Division following their promotion from the Fourth Division. Progressing to the Fifth Round of the FA Cup, there they set a Vale Park and club-record attendance of 49,768, in a 2–1 defeat by Aston Villa on 20 February. In the first of a short-lived Supporters' Clubs' Trophy, they lost to rivals Stoke City 5–3 on aggregate; whilst in the league they finished a respectable fourteenth, thirteen points from both promotion and relegation.

Overview

Third Division
The pre-season saw the arrival of Morgan Hunt from Norwich City for a four-figure fee, and outside-left Cliff Portwood from Preston North End for £750.

The season began with a 3–2 win over Reading at Elm Park, Norman Low having selected a first eleven without any of the new signings. However, after a 1–0 win over Bournemouth & Boscombe Athletic Vale began to struggle, picking up just a point in their next six games. Low tried to sign Stanley Matthews, still going strong aged 44 for Blackpool, but a deal could not be reached. On 5 September, Tranmere Rovers beat Vale 6–0 at Prenton Park after Roy Sproson left the field in the first half with a gashed leg. Low then traded John Cunliffe and £2,000 to Stoke City in exchange for winger Harry Oscroft and centre-half Peter Ford. An improvement took place, and despite trouble in front of goal, the team won seven successive games at Burslem. In October, Jack Wilkinson was sold to Exeter City for £2,500, having lost his place in the starting eleven. On 28 December, Vale recorded a 7–0 win over Halifax Town, causing The Sentinel'''s "T.G.F." to remark that "rarely have the opposition been so completely outplayed".

In March, Graham Barnett was sold to Tranmere Rovers for £5,000, having lost his form. The "Valiants" continued to perform well at home, but lose on their travels. The departure of top-scorer Barnett meant the club 'urgently needed a top-class inside-forward'. This was proven with a run of just four goals in seven matches, culminating in only two points and dashed hopes of promotion. In danger of relegation, the players rallied to win seven points from the final five games. The penultimate match was a 6–3 loss to Mansfield Town at Field Mill, whilst Vale then won against Swindon Town 6–1 in a game that was alleged to have been fixed by Jimmy Gauld.

They finished in fourteenth spot with 46 points, a good finish for a club just promoted. Stan Steele had put in his third successive ever-present season, whilst Barnett was the top-scorer despite leaving in March. The club toured Czechoslavakia at the end of the season, due to Stoke-on-Trent's close relationship with the town of Lidice that developed from local MP Barnett Stross's Lidice Shall Live campaign. The team defeated Cottwaldov, Přerov, Karlovy Vary; drew with FK Teplice; and were beaten by Jihlava.

Finances
On the financial side, a £1,454 loss was announced despite a £10,352 donation from the Sportsmen's Association. Gate receipts had risen by £1,680 due to the Aston Villa game, however average home attendance was down by around 2,000. Wages also increased by a more considerable £7,064, though there was a transfer credit of £3,500. There were 22 players retained, Roy Pritchard and Morgan Hunt were not amongst them, leaving for Wellington Town and Boston United respectively.

In May, the club took a five-match tour of Czechoslovakia. They experienced a culture shock, playing with a smaller, 'half-inflated' ball, and finding referees much more strict. However the tour was a success and much enjoyed by the players and their hosts.

Cup competitions
In the FA Cup, Vale eased past Dorchester Town of the Western League 2–1 after Graham Barnett injured Dorchester's keeper. In the next round Vale beat Queens Park Rangers 2–1 in a replay, after a fifty-yard strike from David Raine helped them to a 3–3 draw in the original match. In the Third Round, they met Second Division high-flyers Cardiff City at Ninian Park, and were not concerned as Graham Barnett responded to Low's warning that the Wales captain faced them by saying "So fucking what? My mother could play for Wales". They beat Cardiff 2–0 with a solid performance. Drawn against Scunthorpe United at Glanford Park, 'the defence took the honours' in a 1–0 win. The Fifth Round draw saw Vale face a home tie with Aston Villa, another second tier club. A still-standing club-record attendance of 49,768 turned up for the game on 20 February, resulting in £8,500 worth of gate receipts for the Vale. Brian Jackson gave Vale a 36th-minute lead, but the "Villans" came back to win the match with six minutes to spare.

In the Supporters' Clubs' Trophy, Vale lost to Stoke 5–3 on aggregate.

League table

ResultsPort Vale's score comes first''

Football League Third Division

Results by matchday

Matches

FA Cup

Supporters' Clubs' Trophy

Player statistics

Appearances

Top scorers

Transfers

Transfers in

Transfers out

References
Specific

General

Port Vale F.C. seasons
Port Vale